I Used to Be Darker is a 2013 independent drama film set and shot in Maryland, the third feature film directed by Matthew Porterfield.

Plot 
Fleeing Northern Ireland after realizing she was pregnant, 19-year-old Taryn finds refuge with her aunt Kim in Baltimore. She is parting ways with her partner, Bill, under the reproachful gaze of their daughter Abby.

Cast

Deragh Campbell as Taryn
Hannah Gross as Abby
Ned Oldham as Bill
Kim Taylor as Kim
Nicholas Petr as Nick
Geoff Grace as Geoff
John Belanger as Ben
Jack Carneal as Jack
Juan Eloy Carrera as Arcade Player
Adèle Exarchopoulos as Camille
Blake Pruitt as High Schooler
Declan Sammon as Sam
Ellis Woodward as Tom
Jimi Zhivago as Jimi

Development

Production
In July 2011, Matthew Porterfield started raising money to fund the production of I Used to Be Darker via Kickstarter. The project achieved its goal of $40,000 on August 13, 2011.

Cast
Porterfield had already known Ned Oldham for several years before casting him as Bill, and Amy Belk went to college with Kim Taylor in the 1990s. After meeting Taylor and seeing her perform, Porterfield "knew almost immediately she had what [he] was looking for". Porterfield first met Hannah Gross and Deragh Campbell when they attended the premiere of his previous film, Putty Hill (2010), but didn't keep in touch with them. He later auditioned Gross, following advice from a friend who is a professor at New York University, where Gross studies in the Experimental Theater Wing. Through Gross, Porterfield later met Campbell and cast them both in the film.

Reception

Critical response
On Rotten Tomatoes the film has an approval rating of 81% based on 21 reviews, with an average rating of 7.34 out of 10. On Metacritic, the film received a weighted average score of 69 out of 100, based on 10 reviews, which indicates "generally favorable reviews".

A.A. Dowd of The A.V. Club gave the film a grade A−, and wrote: "Drenched in the evening glow of its urban and suburban backdrops, Darker comes alive in the dark, when its characters are drowning their sorrows in song, the sauce, or conversation."
Sheri Linden of the Los Angeles Times wrote: "It's a story of contained chaos, quietly observed — one that catches fire more in retrospect than in the viewing."

Accolades
I Used to Be Darker won the award for Best Narrative Feature at the Berlin International Film Festival in 2013 and Matthew Porterfield won the award for Best Director at the Buenos Aires International Festival of Independent Cinema.

References

External links
 
 
 

2013 films
2013 drama films
American independent films
Films set in Baltimore
Films shot in Baltimore
Kickstarter-funded films
American drama films
Crowdfunded films
2010s English-language films
2013 independent films
2010s American films